John Inglis (15 September 1857 – 30 October 1942) was a Scottish footballer who played as a goalkeeper.

Career
Inglis played club football for Kilmarnock Athletic (winning the Ayrshire Cup twice), and made one appearance for Scotland in 1884. He was the only serving player from Kilmarnock Athletic (not to be confused with Kilmarnock) to have been selected for international duty.

References

1857 births
1942 deaths
Place of death missing
Footballers from East Ayrshire
Scottish footballers
Scotland international footballers
Association football goalkeepers